The Queen's College Boat Club (abbreviated QCBC) is the rowing club for members of The Queen's College, Oxford. It is one of the oldest boat clubs in the world, being founded in 1827.

History
In 1837, the Club represented Oxford in a race against Lady Margaret Boat Club, representing Cambridge, and won. This event, held on the River Thames at Henley-on-Thames, is credited with leading to support from the town for the establishment of the Henley Royal Regatta.

The club was last Head of the River in Eights in 1957, and in Torpids in 1958.

A women's boat first competed in 1981 after admission of women to the college. It has since risen to as high as 2nd on the river during the 2006 Torpids competition, and 10th on the river during Summer Eights 2005.

In recent years the men's first and second boats have risen steadily through the rankings of Summer Eights with the first eight now positioned at 16th on the river and second eight at 52nd as of 2023. Notably, both boats achieved 'blades' (bumping on each day of the competition) in both the 2015 and 2017 regattas.

The Women's first boat recently achieved blades in Torpids 2023, breaking the QCBC Women's Side record by bumping up 6 positions in one campaign.

See also
Torpids
Summer Eights

References

External links
 Official website

1827 establishments in England
Rowing clubs of the University of Oxford
Boat Club
Sports clubs established in 1827
Rowing clubs in Oxfordshire
Rowing clubs of the River Thames